Francesco Fortezza (1621–1693) was a Roman Catholic prelate who served as Bishop of Siracusa (1676–1693).

Biography
Francesco Fortezza was born in 1621 in Mallorca, Spain.
On 14 Dec 1676, he was appointed during the papacy of Pope Innocent XI as Bishop of Siracusa.
On 20 Dec 1676, he was consecrated bishop by Carlo Pio di Savoia, Cardinal-Priest of San Crisogono, with Angelo della Noca, Archbishop Emeritus of Rossano, and Carlo Loffredo, Bishop of Molfetta, serving as co-consecrators. 
He served as Bishop of Siracusa until his death on 13 Nov 1693.

References

External links and additional sources
 (for Chronology of Bishops) 
 (for Chronology of Bishops)  

17th-century Roman Catholic bishops in Sicily
Bishops appointed by Pope Innocent XI
1621 births
1693 deaths